was a Japanese project group consisting of former Dream member Yu Hasebe and soloists Aiko Kayō and Nao Nagasawa. Their debut single was released on July 11, 2007, and served as the ending theme to Girl's Box the Movie.

Members
 Yu Hasebe
 Nao Nagasawa
 Aiko Kayo

Discography

Singles

References

Musical groups established in 2007
Japanese pop music groups
Japanese girl groups
Avex Group artists
Musical groups from Tokyo